Bruno Tiago Fernandes Andrade (born 1 April 1981), known as Bruno Tiago, is a Portuguese retired footballer who played as a midfielder.

After very brief spells in the Primeira Liga and unassuming stints in Spain, he was forced to retire still in his 20s due to injury.

Club career
Bruno Tiago was born in Santo Tirso, Porto District. Having grown through the ranks of Minho's Vitória S.C. he moved to Spain in 2000–01, joining second division club UD Salamanca where he would remain two and a half seasons (with a loan to lowly Real Ávila CF in between), without any impact.

Bruno Tiago returned to Portugal in January 2003 where, after a spell with Sport Clube Dragões Sandinenses, he signed with Gil Vicente F.C. for the 2004–05 campaign. He made his Primeira Liga debut on 28 August 2004 in a 2–3 away loss against Sporting CP, and finished his first year with 25 league appearances.

In July 2007, Bruno Tiago moved to Vitória's neighbours S.C. Braga. Only one week into pre-season he seriously broke his leg, being ruled out for the season's duration; following a two-year spell on the sidelines, he was forced to retire from the game at only 28.

References

External links

1981 births
Living people
People from Santo Tirso
Portuguese footballers
Association football midfielders
Primeira Liga players
Liga Portugal 2 players
Segunda Divisão players
F.C. Tirsense players
Vitória S.C. players
S.C. Dragões Sandinenses players
Gil Vicente F.C. players
S.C. Braga players
Segunda División players
Segunda División B players
UD Salamanca players
Portugal youth international footballers
Portuguese expatriate footballers
Expatriate footballers in Spain
Portuguese expatriate sportspeople in Spain
Sportspeople from Porto District